The president of the Republic of Ghana is the elected head of state and head of government of Ghana, as well as commander-in-chief of the Ghana Armed Forces. The current president of Ghana is Nana Akufo-Addo, who won the 2020 presidential election against former president, John Dramani Mahama, by a margin of 4.23%. He was sworn into office for his second term on 7 January 2021.

Eligibility
According to Chapter 8, Article 62 of the 1992 Constitution of Ghana, a person shall not be qualified for election as the president of Ghana unless: 

(a) is a citizen of Ghana by birth
(b) has attained the age of forty years; and
(c) is a person who is otherwise qualified to be elected a Member of Parliament, except that the disqualifications set out in paragraphs (c), (d), and (e) of clause (2) of article 94 of this Constitution shall not be removed, in respect of any such person, by a presidential pardon or by the lapse of time as provided for in clause (5) of that article.

Presidential candidates must lodge a nomination document signed by at least two registered voters in each district, and includes the name of a vice presidential running mate.

The president serves a four-year term. The president is limited to two terms, whether successive or separated. If the president dies, resigns, is permanently incapacitated, or is removed from office, the vice president automatically ascends as president for the balance of the term. If the vice president ascends to the presidency before more than half of the presidential term expires, the vice president is only allowed to run for a single full term as president. If both the president and vice president are unable to perform the duties of president, the Speaker of Parliament becomes acting president, and new elections must be held within three months.

Oath of office 
The president of Ghana must be sworn in by the chief justice before Parliament and the citizens of Ghana. The president-elect must repeat the following:

"I, ___ having been elected to the high office of President of the Republic of Ghana do (in the name of the Almighty God swear) (solemnly affirm) that I will be faithful and true to the Republic of Ghana; that I will at all times preserve, protect and defend the Constitution of the Republic of Ghana; and that I dedicate myself to the service and well-being of the people of the Republic of Ghana and to do right to all manner of persons.

I further (solemnly swear) (solemnly affirm) that should I at any time break this oath of office; I shall submit myself to the laws of the Republic of Ghana and suffer the penalty for it. (So help me God)".

Insignia
After the oath of office has been taken by the elected president, these following insignia are handed over to the president. These devices are used to display the rank of his/her office and are used on special occasions.

President's Sword  (image) and the Presidential Seat, Presidential standard pole and state sword . A carved wooden seat overlaid with gold.

Powers and duties of the president

Chapter 8 of the Constitution of Ghana states the duties and the powers of the president.
The president is required to:
 uphold the Constitution
 exercise executive authority
 preserve the safety and homeland of Ghana.

Also, the president is given the powers:
 as the leader of the executive branch of government
 as the commander-in-chief of the military
 to declare war
 to hold referendums regarding issues of national importance
 to issue executive orders
 to issue medals in honor of service for the nation
 to issue pardons
 to declare a state of emergency suspending all laws or enacting a state of martial law.

The president may execute or cause to be executed treaties, agreements or conventions in the name of the Republic of Ghana. The president shall take precedence over the populace of the Republic of Ghana and may refer important policy matters to a national referendum, declare war, conclude peace and other treaties, appoint senior public officials, and grant amnesty (with the concurrence of the Parliament of Ghana). In times of serious internal or external turmoil or threat, or economic or financial crises, the president may assume emergency powers "for the maintenance of national security or public peace and order".

The president shall be removed from office if found, in accordance with the provisions of the Constitution, Chapter 8 section 69 (ii) – prejudicial or inimical to the economy or the security of the Republic of Ghana. The president shall cease to hold office on the date the Parliament of Ghana votes to remove the president from office.

 Airplanes for long-distance travel
 Dassault Falcon 900 (long-range) – main jet aircraft
 Embraer Jet 190 (long-range)
 Helicopters
 Mil Mi-17

The presidential aircraft uses the colour scheme as the flag of Ghana in stripes, except for the use of the Ghanaian coat of arms on the empennage instead of the flag of Ghana.

In October 2012 a jet aircraft was acquired in the Golden Jubilee House. According to the Chief of the Golden Jubilee House Property Agency acquisition of an Embraer 190 jet aircraft for the president cost 105 million cedis (about US$55 million). The jet aircraft's planned location is in the Ghanaian Presidential Retreat's Peduase Lodge.

List of presidents

Timeline since 1960

Latest election

See also
Chief of Staff (Ghana)

References

Politics of Ghana
 
Articles which contain graphical timelines
1960 establishments in Ghana